Jirak may refer to:
Karel Boleslav Jirák (1891–1972), Czechoslovak composer and conductor
Jirak, Iran
 Jirak, alternate name of Jik-e Sofla, Iran